The World Is a Ghetto is the fifth album by American band War, released in late 1972 on United Artists Records. The album attained the number one spot on Billboard, and was Billboard magazine's Album of the Year as the best-selling album of 1973. In addition to being Billboard's #1 album of 1973, the album was ranked number 444 on Rolling Stone magazine's original list of the 500 greatest albums of all time. The title track became a gold record.

Cover
The cover illustration, a light-hearted drawing showing a Rolls-Royce with a flat tire in a ghetto, was drawn by Howard Miller, with Lee Oskar credited with album concept.

It uses a blue and black colour pallet as a reference to the melancholy nature of the album.

Alternate formats
The album was also made available in a 4-channel surround sound (quadraphonic) mix in the 8-track tape format (United Artists UA-DA178-H).

Critical reception

In a contemporary review for Rolling Stone, Gordon Fletcher said The World Is a Ghetto found War progressing further in the arena of soul and jazz music, and "closer to total mastery of their music as they attempt to use it to communicate the essence of ghetto life". Robert Christgau was less enthusiastic in Creem, believing he "should love this big Afro-roots band" in theory, but was critical of the fairly slow quality of the music and the lyrics, calling it "blackstrap-rock". He singled out the "jazz pretensions" of "Four Cornered Room" and "City, Country, City", finding the latter's rhythmic foundation solid but the song too long and mawkish.

In a retrospective review, Bruce Eder from AllMusic said the album's music encompassed "not only soul and funk but elements of blues and psychedelia" and a "classy, forward-looking production" comparable to Curtis Mayfield's 1970 album Curtis and Marvin Gaye's What's Going On (1971). The Crisis journalist Bruce Britt identified The World Is a Ghetto as one of the few Black rock recordings that became a classic within the pan-African community during FM rock radio's segregation of African-American rock acts in the 1970s, a viewpoint echoed by music historian Jefferson Morley. The Washington Post critic Geoffrey Himes names it an exemplary release of the progressive soul development from 1968 to 1973.

Track listing
All tracks composed by War (Papa Dee Allen, Harold Brown, B. B. Dickerson, Lonnie Jordan, Charles Miller, Lee Oskar, Howard E. Scott).

Side one
"The Cisco Kid" – 4:35
"Where Was You At" – 3:25
"City, Country, City" – 13:18

Side two
"Four Cornered Room" – 8:30
"The World Is a Ghetto" – 10:10
"Beetles in the Bog" – 3:51

CD bonus tracks
In 2012 the album was re-released on CD in a 40th anniversary expanded edition with 4 previously unreleased bonus tracks.

"Freight Train Jam" - 5:41
"58 Blues" - 5:26
"War Is Coming - Blues version" - 6:15
"The World Is a Ghetto - Rehearsal take" - 8:06

Personnel
War
Howard Scott – guitar, percussion, vocals
B.B. Dickerson – bass, percussion, vocals
Lonnie Jordan – organ, piano, timbales, percussion, vocals
Harold Brown – drums, percussion, vocals
Papa Dee Allen – conga, bongos, percussion, vocals
Charles Miller – clarinet, alto, tenor and baritone saxophones, percussion, vocals
Lee Oskar – harmonica, percussion, vocals

Charts

Singles
Singles from the album include "The World Is a Ghetto" backed with "Four Cornered Room", and "The Cisco Kid" backed with "Beetles in the Bog".

See also
List of Billboard 200 number-one albums of 1973
List of Billboard number-one R&B albums of 1973

References

External links
 War-The World Is A Ghetto at Discogs

1972 albums
War (American band) albums
United Artists Records albums
Albums produced by Jerry Goldstein (producer)